Gina Reuland (born 28 August 1992) is a track and field pole vaulter who competes internationally for Luxembourg

Her personal best is 4.30 m, which is national record for Luxembourg.

Achievements

References

1992 births
Living people
Luxembourgian pole vaulters
European Games competitors for Luxembourg
Athletes (track and field) at the 2015 European Games
Competitors at the 2015 Summer Universiade